Sara McManus (born 13 December 1991) is a Swedish curler from Gävle. She currently plays third on Team Anna Hasselborg. With the Hasselborg rink, she won the gold medal in women's curling at the 2018 Winter Olympics.

Career
McManus was the alternate for the Swedish team at the 2009 and 2010 World Junior Curling Championships. The team, which was skipped by Anna Hasselborg, finished in sixth place in 2009 and won the gold medal in 2010. While McManus was listed as an alternate, the team acted as a five-player team, with McManus throwing lead rocks in most of the team's games. The team was taken over by McManus' sister Jonna as skip for the 2011 World Junior Curling Championships where the team placed fourth, with Sara throwing third stones.

Sara took over the team as skip for the 2012 and 2013 World Junior Curling Championships respectively. In 2012, she led her team of Anna Huhta, Marina Stener, and Sofia Mabergs to a 6-3 round robin finish, which put them in a four-way tie for 3rd place. The team won their tiebreak match against Japan and their next playoff game against Russia. However, they lost in the semifinal to the Czech Republic and in the bronze medal game in a re-match with the Russians, finishing in fourth place.

At the 2013 Juniors, McManus again skipped the Swedish junior team with Mabergs and a new front-end of Rosalie Egli and Malin Ekholm. She led the team to a 5-4 round robin record, again in a four-way tie for third place. The team then lost to the Russians in a tiebreak, finishing 5th place overall.

McManus skipped the University of Gävle team, representing Sweden at the 2015 Winter Universiade. There, she led her team of Cecilia Östlund, Huhta, and Mabergs to a 7-2 round robin record in a tie for second place with Russia. However, in the playoffs, they lost to Russia in the semifinal and then Switzerland in the bronze medal game, finishing in fourth place.

McManus was invited to be the alternate on the Swedish team at the 2014 Ford World Women's Curling Championship. The team, which was skipped by Margaretha Sigfridsson, ended up losing the tiebreaker to South Korea, finishing in 5th place. McManus did not play in any games.

McManus would again be the alternate at team Sweden, this time at the 2014 European Curling Championships, on a team skipped by Anna Hasselborg. The team finished fifth, with McManus again not playing in any games.

McManus was invited to play second for the Sigfridsson rink, which was representing Sweden at the 2015 World Women's Curling Championship. The team finished in 7th place, missing the playoffs with a 5-6 round robin record.

In the following season, McManus joined the Hasselborg rink as the third, with the rink representing Sweden at the 2016 European Curling Championships. After finishing the round robin in second place with an 8–2 record, the team won their semifinal match against the Czechs before losing in the final against Russia's Viktoriia Moiseeva rink, earning the team silver medals.  The rink represented Sweden again later in the season at the 2017 World Women's Curling Championship, where they came just short of winning a medal finishing in fourth. The next season, the team made it all the way to the final of the 2018 World Women's Curling Championship before losing to Canada's Jennifer Jones. Team Hasselborg won back-to-back Grand Slam events at the start of the 2018-19 season, the Elite 10 and the Masters. The team lost once again the final of the World Women's Curling Championship this year to Silvana Tirinzoni and Switzerland.

Team Hasselborg began the 2019–20 season at the Stu Sells Oakville Tankard, where they defeated Anna Sidorova in the final. They missed the playoffs at the 2019 AMJ Campbell Shorty Jenkins Classic after going 2–2 in the round robin. They defended their title at the 2019 European Curling Championships. Down 4–3 in the tenth end of the final to Scotland's Eve Muirhead, Hasselborg made a runback on her final stone to score two and win. In Grand Slam play, Team Hasselborg were the most dominant team on the women's side, winning them the 2019–20 Pinty's Cup. They lost in the semifinal of the Masters to Tracy Fleury before winning the next three Slams, the Tour Challenge, National and the Canadian Open. The team was set to represent Sweden at the 2020 World Women's Curling Championship before the event got cancelled due to the COVID-19 pandemic. The Canadian Open would be their last event of the season as both the Players' Championship and the Champions Cup Grand Slam events were also cancelled due to the pandemic.

The Hasselborg rink won the first event of the 2020–21 season, defeating Raphaela Keiser in the final of the 2020 Women's Masters Basel. Next, they played Team Wranå in the Sweden National Challenge in December 2020, where they lost 17–12. A "curling bubble" was set up in Calgary, Canada in the spring, which hosted several events, including the 2021 World Women's Curling Championship and two slams. Team Hasselborg competed in both the 2021 Champions Cup and the 2021 Players' Championship, finishing 0–4 at the Champions Cup and reaching the semifinals of the Players'. The following week, the team represented Sweden at the Worlds. They finished third through the round robin with a 10–3 record, qualifying them for the playoffs. After defeating Canada's Kerri Einarson 8–3 in the qualification round, they lost a narrow 8–7 semifinal against the RCF, skipped by Alina Kovaleva. This put them in the bronze medal game, which they lost 9–5 to the Tabitha Peterson rink of the United States. On June 4, 2021, Team Hasselborg was selected as the Olympic Team for the 2022 Winter Olympics.

Team Hasselborg began the 2021–22 season competing in the men's Baden Masters tour event, where they missed the playoffs. At the 2021 Women's Masters Basel, the team made it all the way to the final, where they lost to Denmark's Madeleine Dupont. Next, they played in the 2021 Masters Grand Slam event, where they again missed the playoffs. They were able to rebound at the 2021 National, however, claiming the title with a 9–6 victory over Tracy Fleury in the final game. In November, Team Hasselborg again represented Sweden at the 2021 European Curling Championships where they finished third in the round robin with a 7–2 record. They then defeated Russia's Alina Kovaleva in the semifinal before dropping the final to Scotland's Eve Muirhead, settling for silver. The next event for Team Hasselborg was the 2022 Winter Olympics, where they attempted to defend their gold medal from 2018. The team placed second after the round robin preliminary stage with a 7–2 record. This earned them a semifinal berth where they would face Great Britain's Muirhead rink. In one of the highest-scoring games in curling, Muirhead scored a single point in the extra end to win 12–11, ending Hasselborg's chances of repeating as Olympic gold medallists. They did still earn a medal from the Games, however, as they were able to beat Switzerland's Silvana Tirinzoni rink 9–7 in the bronze medal game. Next for the Swedish rink was the 2022 World Women's Curling Championship, where they finished fourth in the round robin with a 9–3 record. They then defeated the United States Cory Christensen in the qualification game before dropping the semifinal and bronze medal games to Switzerland and Canada, respectively, placing fourth. Team Hasselborg wrapped up their season at the final two Slams of the season, the 2022 Players' Championship and the 2022 Champions Cup. At the Players', the team began with two straight losses before rattling off six straight victories to claim the event title, despite McManus and Anna Hasselborg feeling ill in the final game due to food poisoning. With the victory, Team Hasselborg became the first women's team to win a career Grand Slam (winning all four 'majors'). At the Champions Cup, they went undefeated up until the semifinal round where they were eliminated by Kerri Einarson.

Personal life
McManus is currently engaged to Joakim Sjölund. She is the daughter of British footballer Stuart McManus.

Grand Slam record

Former events

References

External links

Living people
1991 births
Swedish female curlers
Swedish people of Scottish descent
Continental Cup of Curling participants
Sportspeople from Gothenburg
People from Gävle
Curlers at the 2018 Winter Olympics
Curlers at the 2022 Winter Olympics
Olympic curlers of Sweden
Olympic gold medalists for Sweden
Olympic bronze medalists for Sweden
Medalists at the 2018 Winter Olympics
Medalists at the 2022 Winter Olympics
Olympic medalists in curling
European curling champions
Swedish curling champions